The Lower Austrian Village and Urban Renewal Association is the central joint spatial planning organization of all municipalities of the Lower Austria province.

This organization has a special position in Austria as the pioneer of regional development in Austria and the only association of its kind with the exception of Styria and Salzburg. In other countries the provincial government is directly responsible.

Lower Austria
Urban planning in Austria